Shivarathri Mahathme is a 1964 Indian Kannada-language film directed by P. R. Kaundinya. The film stars Rajkumar, Leelavathi and K. S. Ashwath. The movie was dubbed in Telugu in 1965 as Shivarathri Mahatyam.

Cast
 Rajkumar as Vijaya, King of Simhapuri
 Leelavathi Vasanthi
 K. S. Ashwath as Veera Simha, Vijaya's father
 M. Jayashree as Vijaya's mother
 Narasimharaju as Panchu
 Rajasree as Ranjana
 Seetharama Shastri
 Prabhakara Reddy
 Sobhan Babu

Soundtrack

Reception

References

External links
 

1964 films
1960s Kannada-language films